{{New Testament manuscript infobox
| form   = Papyrus
| number = 𝔓23
| image  = Papyrus 23 James 1,15-18.jpg
| isize  = 
| caption= James 1:15-18
| name   = P. Oxy. X 1229
| sign   = 
| text   = James 1 †
| script = Greek
| date   = 3rd century
| found  = Egypt
| now at = University of Illinois
| cite   = B. P. Grenfell & A. S. Hunt, Oxyrynchus Papyri’' X, (London 1914), pp. 16-18
| size   = 12.1 x 11.2 cm
| type   = Alexandrian text-type
| cat    = I
| hand   = 
| note   = 
}}

Papyrus 23 (in the Gregory-Aland numbering), designated by 𝔓23, is an early copy of the New Testament in Greek. It is a papyrus manuscript of the Epistle of James, it contains only James 1:10-12,15-18. The manuscript paleographically has been assigned to the early 3rd century.

 Description 

The Nomina sacra are written fully, abbreviations are used only at the end of lines. There has been noticed the occurrence of the ungrammatical αποσκιασματος found also in Codex Sinaiticus and Vaticanus in James 1:17.

The Greek text of this codex is a representative of the Alexandrian text-type (or rather proto-Alexandrian). Aland placed it in Category I. This manuscript displays the greatest agreement with codices א A C, which represent the best text of the Catholic epistles, and then with Codex Vaticanus and Papyrus 74.

It is currently housed in the Spurlock Museum at the University of Illinois (G. P. 1229) in Urbana, Illinois.

 See also 

 List of New Testament papyri

 References 

 Further reading 

 B. P. Grenfell & A. S. Hunt, Oxyrynchus Papyri X, (London 1914), pp. 16–18. 
 R. H. Charles, Revelation of St. John'', ICC, vol. II (Edinbourgh, 1920), pp. 448–450.

External links 

 𝔓23 (P.Oxy 1229) recto James 1:10-12
 𝔓23 (P.Oxy 1229) verso James 1:15-18
 P23 images at the Center for the Study of New Testament Manuscripts

New Testament papyri
3rd-century biblical manuscripts
Early Greek manuscripts of the New Testament
Epistle of James papyri